Amita Kanekar is a Goa-based writer and architectural historian, whose well-received debut novel A Spoke in the Wheel was published by HarperCollins Publishers and later again by Navayana. Kanekar's second book was a guidebook to Portuguese sea fort architecture of the Deccan, while her third was another novel, Fear of Lions, published by Hachette in 2019. She also writes essays and newspaper columns on architecture, history, and politics, and also teaches architectural history and theory at the Goa College of Architecture.

Early life
Kanekar was born in Madgaon (Margao) in Goa in 1965 and lived in Navelim, a nearby village, till the age of two, before leaving for the US and subsequently for Mumbai where she taught architectural history at the Kamla Raheja Vidyanidhi Institute for Architecture at Juhu, and Comparative Mythologies at the University of Mumbai.

Her father Suresh Kanekar was jailed twice by the then Portuguese government for his participation in the movement against colonial rule. Her maternal aunt was Mitra Bir, educationalist, who was sentenced to twelve years in jail at the age of 22, and later went on to open schools for girls at Madgaon (Margao), Verem, Kakora and other locations in Goa, as also centres for adult and vocational education for women, before her death in 1978. Mitra was married to the late Madhav Bir, member of the Goa legislative assembly and Gandhian. Kanekar's maternal uncle, the late M. V. Kakodkar was also active in the campaign to open temples to all in Goa the 1960s.

Career
Kanekar's first novel about the Buddha, A Spoke in the Wheel, has earned favourable reviews. Published in 2005 by HarperCollins India, the book went into its second impression that year itself. A second edition was later published by Navayana (Delhi) in 2014. Her second book is an architectural guidebook, Portuguese Sea Forts of Goa, with Chaul, Korlai and Vasai (Jaico 2015). Her third book, Fear of Lions, is again historical fiction, set in Mughal Hindustan and published by Hachette in 2019. She has also published scholarly papers on architectural history, and writes regular newspaper columns on architecture, history, and politics.

A Spoke in the Wheel
A Spoke in the Wheel is an epic story alternating between two narratives—the story of the Buddha himself, and his times, told not as frozen legend, but brought to life with historical detail and craftsmanship. The parallel narrative is that of the chronicler, Upali, a Buddhist monk living in the time of the Mauryan Emperor Ashoka, three hundred years after the Buddha's death. Upali, an embittered survivor of Ashoka's infamous conquest of Kalinga, attempts to recover from the horror of war and destruction by writing the "deglorified and factual" story of the Buddha's life and teachings. This turns out to be a difficult, even dangerous exercise, for Upali is swimming against the tide, at a time when the Buddha's Sangha is poised to rise to immense imperial patronage and splendour under Emperor Ashoka. This is a patronage that will sustain Buddhism for over a millennium and help it reach out to half the world's populace.

A Spoke in the Wheel is a story of the Buddha and his disciples—among them an ordinary monk plagued by many questions, and an extraordinary king who seemed to have all the answers and was bent on unifying Buddhism's many schools of thought and making Buddhism his state religion.

Kanekar, who teaches comparative mythology at the University of Mumbai, has said that she began writing her novel on the Buddha in 1998, as the first step in a personal quest to understand India's forgotten social and political revolutions, the historical conditions in which these movements were born, what they achieved, and how these achievements tended to get lost over time in myth and legend. In a statement released about the book Kanekar says she has seen the Buddha as a "historical figure who lived in the foundational epoch of Indian civilisation, whose life and struggle are now almost completely lost in myth, and whose ideas evolved to mean very different things to different people, yet continue to resonate with an all-inclusive and rational message of peace even today, 2500 years after they were first propagated."

Kanekar's first novel is set in 256 BCE (before current era), some three centuries after the death of Buddha and four years since the "terrible battle of Kalinga". Upali, a monk and embittered survivor of the war that made Emperor Ashoka the overlord of virtually the whole of India, hates the emperor intensely. Yet, to him Emperor Ashoka, the "self-proclaimed Beloved of the Gods", entrusts the task of putting the Buddha's life and teachings down for posterity. Kanekar's story tells of an Emperor set on a new conquest—that of Dhamma.

Research for her novel began at the Jawaharlal Nehru University in New Delhi over one extended Diwali vacation, under the initial guidance of Prof. Kunal Chakraborty, of the Centre for Historical Studies at the JNU.

She has said the work involved "intensive reading continued for over a year" before Kanekar began to write, "diffidently, not sure at all about how it was going to turn out". Her goal was "to produce something readable, especially about a period so long ago, especially for a modern television watching generation." Kanekar has said: "The initial idea was to write a book about the Buddha; the choice of the novel-form came later." She describes herself as an "avid novel-reader". This was also because she wanted the book to "be read by as many people as possible, not only academics and Buddhists." But the writing became more difficult, and Kanekar took four years to complete the work. This leads to a "search for the Buddha and a struggle over the past". In Kanekar's words: "What really was the Buddha's message? Ascetic renunciation? Universal salvation? Passive disengagement? Tolerance—even of intolerance? If his message was a critique of violence, how did it come to be championed by the most successfully violent autocrats of ancient India? These are questions that begin to surface among the Buddha's followers, fearfully and then angrily, to be viciously debated even as Dhamma rises to glorious imperial patronage, a patronage that will sustain it for over a millennium and reach it to half the world's populace."

Kanekar calls hers "a story about the Buddha and his disciples, among them an ordinary monk, one of the questioners, and an extraordinary king, who seemed to have all the answers". She says it is also about how the movement called Dhamma was born, spread, changed lives and got changed itself.

In her book, Upali's chronicle—a deglorified, fictional account of the life of Buddha—alternates with that of Upali's own life during the reign of Emperor Ashoka and including both these parallel narratives with a wealth of historical detail and philosophical debate.

Reviews
Indian national newspaper The Hindu said: "... the book draws from Indian history to such good effect that one can't help wondering if things actually did happen this way. Another interesting aspect of the book is the dismantling of each legend associated with the Buddha. Life in the Magadhan Empire is also portrayed with an eye to historical accuracy. Quotes from Ashokan edicts... which we know of as history but couldn't really relate to... now come alive with a new imagery..."

Outlook magazine from New Delhi wrote: "Amita Kanekar's novel about Emperor Ashoka and the Buddhist monk Upali... successfully captures the stress and strains of monastic life, and brings alive the centuries following the death of the Buddha. when his teachings were taking the form of a canonical corpus... While many historical fictions make only  references to real history, the present one doesn't... An interesting mix of erudition and historical imagination..."

Deccan Herald of Bangalore commented: "Amita Kanekar's debut novel, A Spoke in the Wheel, is an attempt to strip away layer by layer such fanciful stories surrounding the Buddha and reveal him as an ordinary man who had an extraordinary approach to his problems. The novel has an interesting structure... Throughout the book Amita presents issues of ethics and socio economic  relationships that are relevant even today. The narrative is rich in detail and every aspect of life in those ancient times stands out vividly before the reader."

Publication data
A Spoke in the Wheel by Amita Kanekar is published HarperCollins India in 2005, and priced at Rs 395 (in India). Printed Pages: 447. First edition paperback new 13 cm x 20 cm.  LCCN 2005323538
OCLC # 60862064

The Portuguese Sea Forts of Goa, with Chaul, Korlai and Vasai
Kanekar's second book was an architectural guidebook, The Portuguese Sea Forts of Goa, with Chaul, Korlai and Vasai (Jaico 2015), one of the series on the architectural heritage of the Deccan brought out by the Deccan Heritage Foundation. Most of the photographs in the book are by Surendra Kumar.

Fear of Lions
Her latest book is a novel, another work of historical fiction, Fear of Lions (Hachette 2019). It revolves around a peasant revolt of 1672, in the time of the Mughal emperor Aurangzeb. The rebels were 17th century followers of Kabir's radical social ideas, a small and short-lived peasant community that eschewed caste, religious and gender divides. They rose in revolt in 1672 against the social oppression and economic exploitation of the time, and managed to set up their own administration in a few towns and villages south of Delhi before being crushed by the Mughal armies.

Kanekar has said that "the experience of writing it has been very different from the first, mainly because there are far more historical records and sureties for the background of the Mughal period than the Buddha's time, but hardly any materials on the protagonists; these rebels are almost as unknown and unheard-of as the Buddha is a legend."

References

External links

The Hindu, review of A Spoke in the Wheel
Deccan Herald review
Tribune, Chandigarh review
Outlook, India review (needs registration)
Indiaclub.com review
The Buddhist Channel review
TomFolio.com link
Dealtime.com link
Post on soc.culture.indian.goa
Blog link to A Spoke in the Wheel
Blog reference to A Spoke in the Wheel
Reference on Goanet
Excerpt from Fear of Lions

The Wire review of Fear of Lions
Mumbai Mirror review of Fear of Lions
The Hindu review of Fear of Lions
Raiot review of Fear of Lions
Madras Courier review of Fear of Lions
Frontline review of Fear of Lions

1965 births
Living people
Novelists from Goa
American novelists of Indian descent
American women novelists
American women writers of Indian descent
Academic staff of the University of Mumbai
People from Margao
21st-century Indian novelists
Indian women novelists
21st-century Indian women writers
Women writers from Goa
American women academics
21st-century American women